Kurissery Gopala Pillai  was an orientalist, researcher, lexicographer, poet, essayist, grammarian and scholar of Malayalam and Sanskrit languages. He specialised in Comparative study of languages.

Biography
He was born to Cheruvilayil Padmanabha Pillai and L. Kalyani Amma on 3 March 1914 at Panmana in Kollam district. He married P. Soudamini Amma in 1943. He is survived by two daughters and two sons.

Education
He did his schooling in Panmana Manayil High School and later joined the H.H The Maharaja's Sanskrit College, Thiruvananthapuram. He had five years of Sanskrit study before joining the college. From Sanskrit College, he passed the Sastry and completed Upadhyaya courses.

Career
Gopala Pillai started his professional career as Headmaster of Sanskrit schools at Perumbuzha (1934) and Panmana (1935). From 1938 to '42, he was the headmaster of Brahmanandodayam Sanskrit School run by Advaithashramam in Kalady. He was also the secretary of the Hindu Youth Service Society which was presided over by Swami Agamananda, social reformer and founder of Advaita Ashram at Kalady. During 1944-'45, he enrolled to military service and traveled across North India.

Later he worked as Malayalam Lexicon Pandit at University of Kerala (1954–61) and as research officer at Oriental Research Institute and Manuscript Library of the University of Kerala at Thiruvananthapuram (1961–71). He served as the president of Malayalam Sahitya Samsat from 1966 to 1972 and worked in Kerala Sahitya Sahakarana Sanghom (1967–70). He was also a member of Kavimandalam.

Writer
Gopala Pillai who was a versatile writer in Malayalam has written books in Sanskrit as well. He had knowledge of Hindi, Bengali, Assamese, Punjabi, Gujarati, and Kannada languages too. His works spanned several genres covering both poetry and prose and covered diverse topics.

Kerala Gauthameeyam is one of the important works in Malayalam on Tarka sastra. Originally published in 1959, it was re-published in 2013 by Kerala Bhasha Institute. "Vidyadhirajan" is the biography of Chattampi Swamikal. "Udayakiranangal" was prescribed as text book for graduate courses of University of Kerala during 1970s. "Vijayalahari" is a collection of poems celebrating Indian victory in the Indo-Pakistani War of 1971. He has also compiled "Sabdavaijayanthi", a Sanskrit- Malayalam dictionary.

Major works
Sanskrit
 Dasakumaracharitha Samgraha (1936)
 Sri Sankara Charitham (1936)
 Srikrishna Vijayam (1936)

Malayalam
 Sabdavaijayanthi (Sanskrit-Malayalam Dictionary, 1942)
 Vasantharagini (Poetic Drama, 1945)
 Vidyadhirajan (Biography, 1947)
 Aharavum Krishiyum (Essays on Agriculture, 1951)
 Kerala Gauthameeyam Tharkasastram (1959)
 Udayakiranangal (Essays, 1967)
 Jeevitha Geetha (Poems, 1972)
 Vijayalahari (Poetry, 1972)
 Sameekshanam (Essays, 1972)
 Vijnana Deepam (Essays, 1972)
 Bhashachinthakal (Essays and debates, 2016)

Awards
He was referred by the title 'Kerala Gauthaman' for his contributions in familiarising Tarka sastra in Malayalam. The book "Kerala Gauthameeyam Tharkasastram" was honoured by the Kerala Sahitya Akademi. He was awarded by the Prime Minister of India and Kerala State Government.

References

Further reading 

 Volume 3, Akhila Vijanakosam (Desk Encyclopedia in 4 volumes); D.C. Books, Kottayam; December 1988 (Page 253)
 Reference Asia Vol. 1 (Asia's First Who's Who of Men and Women of Achievements and Distinctions); Chief Editor- K L Gupta; Tradesman & Men India; August 1975 (Page 367 - 368)
 Reference India 1968-69 (Biographical Notes on Men and Women of Achievements and Distinctions in India); Editor- K L Gupta; Tradesman & Men India; 1969 (Page 40-41)
 Sahithyakara Directory (Who is Who of Malayalam Writers); Kerala Sahitya Akademi, Thrissur; December 1976
 Sree Vidyadhirajan - Kurisseri Gopalapillai at Archive.org
 Selected Catalog at Open Library
 Selected Catalog at Google Books

Indian lexicographers
1914 births
1978 deaths
People from Kollam district
Malayalam-language writers
Sanskrit writers
Writers from Kerala
20th-century Indian poets
20th-century Indian essayists
Indian male poets
Indian male essayists
20th-century Indian male writers
20th-century lexicographers